Futami may refer to:

Places

Japan
 Futami, Ehime, a dissolved town in Iyo District, Ehime Prefecture
 Futami, Mie, a dissolved town in Watarai District, Mie Prefecture
 Futami District, Hokkaido, a district
 Futami District, Hiroshima, a dissolved district

Railway stations
 Higashi-Futami Station, on the Sanyo Electric Railway Main Line in Akashi, Hyōgo
 Higo Futami Station, in Yatsushiro, Kumamoto Prefecture
 Nagato-Futami Station, in the Hohoku area of Shimonoseki, Yamaguchi Prefecture
 Nishi-Futami Station, in Akashi, Hyōgo Prefecture
 Yamato-Futami Station, in Gojō, Nara

Other uses
 , Japanese footballer
 Nobuaki Futami (born 1935), Japanese politician
 Japanese gunboat Futami, a river gunboat of the Imperial Japanese Navy

Fictional characters
 , a pair of twin sisters in The Idolmaster
 Nozomu Futami, a main character in Futakoi

Japanese-language surnames